The 34th Golden Bell Awards (Mandarin:第34屆金鐘獎) was held on March 31, 1999, at the Sun Yat-sen Memorial Hall, Taipei, Taiwan. The ceremony was broadcast live by Formosa Television.

Winners and nominees
Below is the list of winners and nominees for the main categories.

References

1999
1999 television awards
1999 in Taiwan